Twin Maples is an estate in Summit, Union County, New Jersey, United States, listed on the New Jersey Register of Historic Places and the National Register of Historic Places in 1997. Twin Maples was built in 1908, designed by a well-known New York and Montclair architect, Alfred F. Norris, who designed the home in the neoclassical style with a facade dominated by a full-height porch, supported by classical columns.

Twin Maples was purchased by the Fortnightly Club in 1949 and remains the home of the Fortnightly Club (established 1893), as well as the Summit Junior Fortnightly Club, both 501(c)3 charitable organizations.  In 2007, the two clubs joined to renovate historic Twin Maples and opened her doors to area charities for their fundraising events and meetings at suitably low rates.

See also
National Register of Historic Places listings in Union County, New Jersey

References

External links
Twin Maples
The Fortnightly Club
Summit Junior Fortnightly Club

Houses in Union County, New Jersey
Houses on the National Register of Historic Places in New Jersey
Houses completed in 1908
Neoclassical architecture in New Jersey
National Register of Historic Places in Union County, New Jersey
New Jersey Register of Historic Places
Summit, New Jersey
1908 establishments in New Jersey